Tom Serratore is an American college ice hockey coach. He has coached the Bemidji State Beavers men's ice hockey team since the 2001–02 season, taking over from Bob Peters.

Career
Serratore got his first taste of the college game as a player at Mankato State under Don Brose. He played two years for the Mavericks before transferring to Bemidji State to play for the powerhouse Beavers. Under the direction of Bob Peters Serratore arrived just in time to win a Division III National Title in 1986, following up his senior season as team captain.

With his playing career over, Serratore turned to coaching, serving first as an assistant at Brainerd High School, then becoming a head coach at Henry Sibley High School before receiving an opportunity at the collegiate level as an assistant at St. Cloud State in 1993–94. Serratore stayed with the Huskies under Craig Dahl for five seasons before returning to his alma mater just as Bemidji State was joining the Division I ranks. Serratore worked with his old coach for two seasons before Peters retired, allowing Serratore to take over for the legendary figure.

As head coach, Serratore quickly build the Beavers into a conference powerhouse, winning a regular season title in his third season and a conference title the following year. It took a little longer for Serratore to lead Bemidji State to an NCAA Tournament win, but when he got one he didn't stop there, pushing the Beavers into the 2009 Frozen Four. Though the team's record has declined a bit since joining the WCHA, Serratore remains firmly in place behind the bench.

Personal life
Tom Serratore is the brother of Air Force head coach Frank Serratore and is the uncle to Frank's son Tom Serratore. Tom is also a cousin to Robb Stauber.

Head coaching record

References

External links

American ice hockey coaches
Bemidji State Beavers men's ice hockey coaches
Bemidji State Beavers men's ice hockey players
Living people
Minnesota State Mavericks men's ice hockey players
People from Coleraine, Minnesota
Ice hockey coaches from Minnesota
Year of birth missing (living people)
American men's ice hockey forwards
Ice hockey players from Minnesota
Minnesota State University, Mankato alumni